Jimmy Tupou (born 8 August 1992) is a New Zealand rugby union player who plays as a lock or loose forward for the Counties Manukau Steelers in New Zealand's domestic Mitre 10 Cup and the  in the international Super Rugby competition.

Early career

Born in Auckland, Tupou attended Pukekohe High School where he initially played rugby league before finally trying his hand at union in his senior year. He was quickly fast-tracked into the Counties Manukau Under-18 side and later played a key role in helping his club side, Patumahoe lift the McNamara Cup, the senior premier club title in Counties Manukau, in 2012.

Senior career

Coming off the back of impressive performances for New Zealand at Under-20 level, Tupou made the Counties Manukau squad for the 2012 ITM Cup. Despite having just turned 20 before the tournament started, he instantly became a regular starter for the Steelers, playing nine times and scoring one try as the men from Pukekohe lifted the Championship trophy and earned promotion to the Premiership for 2013.

He continued to excel at Premiership level, playing nine times in 2013, 2014 and 2015 and later being named co-captain for the 2016 season. Being one of the senior players in an inexperienced line up he performed admirably, starting 10 of the Steelers' 11 games during a campaign which took them to the Premiership semi-finals before they succumbed to eventual winners .

Super Rugby

Strong performances in his debut season at provincial level with Counties Manukau saw him named in the  squad ahead of the 2013 Super Rugby season. In a star-studded squad featuring the likes of Richie McCaw and Kieran Read in the loose forward department, Tupou's rookie season at Super Rugby level was limited to just two substitute appearances. However, over the following three seasons spent in Canterbury, he became a regular in the 23 man squad. With his appearances generally restricted to that of a second-half substitute, he turned out 12, 11 and 12 times across the 2014, 2015 and 2016 seasons.

Looking for more game time, he agreed a move north to join the Auckland based  ahead of the 2017 Super Rugby season.

International

Tupou was a member of the New Zealand Under 20 team that finished as runner-up in the 2012 IRB Junior World Championship in South Africa. He scored one try in four appearances at the tournament.

Career honours

Counties Manukau

ITM Cup Championship - 2012

Super Rugby statistics

References 

1992 births
New Zealand rugby union players
New Zealand sportspeople of Samoan descent
Rugby union flankers
Rugby union locks
Crusaders (rugby union) players
Counties Manukau rugby union players
Rugby union players from Auckland
Living people
People educated at Pukekohe High School
Blues (Super Rugby) players
Urayasu D-Rocks players